SIAT may refer to:

 S.I.A.T. (Sociedad Ibérica de Automóviles de Turismo), the predecessor company of the Spanish car maker SEAT (S.E.A.T., Sociedad Española de Automóviles de Turismo)
 Siebelwerke/ATG, a German aircraft manufacturer
 Sibaviatrans, a Russian airline
 N-acetyllactosaminide alpha-2,3-sialyltransferase, an enzyme
 SIAT station, metro station in Guangming District, Shenzhen, Guangdong Province, China

See also 
 Siat, a former municipality of Switzerland
 Siats, a genus of dinosaurs